Decade is a 2011 play by Tony Kushner, John Logan and Paul Laverty commemorating the tenth anniversary of the September 11 attacks. Its structure is drawn from the work of the choreographer Pina Bausch and it involves a cast of 12. It premièred in St Katharine Docks (the site of London's World Trade Centre) and was performed from 1 September to 15 October 2011, in a production starring Lia Williams and directed by Rupert Goold.

External links
https://web.archive.org/web/20110703053503/http://www.thisislondon.co.uk/standard/article-23964587-enron-director-rupert-goold-to-tackle-911-legacy-on-10th-anniversary.do

2011 plays
Plays about the September 11 attacks
Plays by Tony Kushner